This is a list of historic sites in Hampshire County in the U.S. state of West Virginia.

Key

Historic sites

Nonextant historic sites

See also
National Register of Historic Places listings in Hampshire County, West Virginia
List of Registered Historic Places in West Virginia

Tourist attractions in Hampshire County, West Virginia
Landmarks in West Virginia
Buildings and structures in Hampshire County, West Virginia